Carroll County Court House is a historic courthouse located at Carrollton, Carroll County, Missouri.  It was built in 1904, and is a 2 1/2 story, Romanesque Revival style building built of locally quarried coursed rough faced sandstone.  Also on the property is the contributing heroic statue of General James Shields.

It was listed on the National Register of Historic Places in 1995.

References

Courthouses on the National Register of Historic Places in Missouri
County courthouses in Missouri
Romanesque Revival architecture in Missouri
Government buildings completed in 1904
Buildings and structures in Carroll County, Missouri
National Register of Historic Places in Carroll County, Missouri